Bridgend Town A.F.C. was a Welsh football club that played in the Welsh Football League.  Historically, their local rivals were Maesteg Park who disbanded in 2009. In 2013, they merged with local rivals Bryntirion Athletic to form Pen-y-Bont.

History
Bridgend Town were originally formed in the early 1920s playing in the Welsh section of the Southern League. Despite finishing 6th, 14th and 4th, the side disbanded.

The club re-emerged in the 1960s playing in the Welsh League and were crowned Division 2 East champions in their first season.  The club won the Welsh league in 1969 and did it again four years later, by that time the name of the club had changed to Everwarm FC due to the sponsorship from the local central heating company of the same name. In the 1976/1977 season Bridgend reached the semi-finals of the Welsh Cup, losing to Cardiff City. The following season Bridgend rejoined the Southern League and were promoted to the Southern Premier Division. In 1979/1980, Bridgend were crowned overall champions of the Southern League, having won the Midland Division of the Southern League, beating Dorchester Town 5–1 in the Championship play-off.

Bridgend returned to the Welsh pyramid in 1983, where they finished runner-up in the National Division twice. After being relegated to the Welsh League First Division and subsequently the Second Division, the club were eventually promoted back to the First Division in 2002/2003, where they have remained since.

Bridgend Town vacated Coychurch Road in 2006 – their home for many years – to make way for associated works related to a new supermarket. They finished with a comprehensive 7–0 win over Croesyceiliog in their last fixture at the ground.

In the 2008–09 season, the club reached the semi-final of the Welsh Cup, losing 2–1 in a tight game to Bangor City who went on to retain the cup.

Temporary grounds and return to Bridgend

Bridgend Town set up a temporary base at Tyn-y-Wern Fields, University of Glamorgan, Treforest, having also played at Porthcawl since vacating Coychurch Road.

The club returned to Bridgend for the 2009–10 season,  playing at the home of Bridgend Rugby, the Brewery Field. Bridgend Town are one of 24 clubs that have applied for a domestic club licence to compete in a 12-team Welsh Premier League for the 2010–11 season.

The Brewery Field meets FAW Domestic Club Licensing requirements.

In December 2008, local company HD Limited announced plans for a "sporting village" at Island Farm, which includes a 15000-seater stadium, a 5000-capacity stadium for Bridgend Ravens and a 2000-capacity stadium for Bridgend Town.

In September 2009, an outline application was lodged with Bridgend County Borough Council.

Merger
It was confirmed in 2013 that the club would merge with local rivals Bryntirion Athletic to form Pen-y-Bont given them access to £1,000,0000 of funding.  The new club is based at Bryntirion Park and started life in Welsh Football League Division One from season 2013–14.

The club's last match was against Pontardawe Town which ended 0–0.

Club honours

League
Southern Football League
Winners: 1979–80
Welsh Football League Division One
Winners: 1968–69, 1972–1973
Runners-up: 1975–76 (as Everwarm); 1976–77, 1984–85, 1985–86
Welsh Football League Division Two
Winners: 1996–97

Cups
Welsh Cup
Semi finalists: 1976–77, 2008–09
Welsh Football League Cup
Winners: 1987–88
Runners-up: 1998–99

References

1920 establishments in Wales
2013 disestablishments in Wales
Defunct football clubs in Wales
Southern Football League clubs
Welsh Football League clubs
Association football clubs established in 1920
Association football clubs disestablished in 2013
Football clubs in Bridgend County Borough